217 (two hundred [and] seventeen) is the natural number following 216 and preceding 218.

In mathematics 
217 is a centered hexagonal number, a 12-gonal number, a centered 36-gonal number, a Fermat pseudoprime to base 5, and a Blum integer. It is both the sum of two positive cubes and the difference of two positive consecutive cubes in exactly one way: . When written in binary, it is a non-repetitive Kaprekar number.

See also
217, the year

References

Integers

ca:Nombre 210#Nombres del 211 al 219